Erik Michael Rosenmeier (born May 26, 1965) is a former professional American football center who played for the Buffalo Bills of the National Football League in 1987. He grew up in Clark, New Jersey, and graduated from Arthur L. Johnson High School in 1983.

References

External links
Pro-Football-Reference

1965 births
Living people
American football centers
Arthur L. Johnson High School alumni
Buffalo Bills players
Colgate Raiders football players
Players of American football from New Jersey
People from Clark, New Jersey
Sportspeople from Plainfield, New Jersey